X20 or X-20 can refer to:

 Boeing X-20 Dyna-Soar, a United States Air Force spaceplane program
 Fujifilm X20, a digital compact camera
 iRiver X20, portable media player
 TGOJ X20, an electric train
 X20 (album), a 2007 album by Suicide Commando
 X20, a World War II X-class submarine
 X20 (New York City bus), an express bus route in New York City
 South African type X-20 water tender

See also 
 
 
 Jet X2O, computer game
 X²O Badkamers Trophy, a Belgian cyclo-cross series